
Gmina Jeżów is an urban-rural gmina (administrative district) in Brzeziny County, Łódź Voivodeship, in central Poland.

Villages
Gmina Jeżów contains the villages and settlements of Brynica, Dąbrowa, Frydrychów, Góra, Jankowice, Jankowice-Kolonia, Jasienin Duży, Jasienin Mały, Jeżów, Kosiska, Leszczyny, Lubiska, Lubiska-Kolonia, Marianówek, Mikulin, Mikulin-Parcela, Mościska, Olszewo, Popień, Popień-Parcela, Przybyszyce, Rewica, Rewica Królewska, Rewica Szlachecka, Rewica-Kolonia, Stare Leszczyny, Strzelna, Taurów, Władysławowo, Wola Łokotowa and Zamłynie.

Neighbouring gminas
Gmina Jeżów is bordered by the gminas of Głuchów, Koluszki, Rogów, Słupia and Żelechlinek.

References
Polish official population figures 2006

Jezow
Brzeziny County